China Weather TV is a TV channel that was established by China Meteorological Administration in May 2006. The channel provides meteorological information and other related life service information. It is also the first meteorological TV channel in China. In January 2013, the channel won an award naming it "The most valuable TV media for public welfare spreading".

Brief introduction 
China Weather TV is a meteorological TV channel established by China Meteorological Administration and undertaken by Huafeng Meteorological Video Information Group. It began broadcasting on May 18, 2006.  Its purpose is "Prevent disasters, serve people". It provides public meteorological service and meteorological disasters preventing service.

List of programs

List of hosts 

 Feng Shu 冯殊
 Guan Jie 关洁
 Guan Wenjun 管文君
 Jin Wei 金威
 Liu Chao 刘超
 Liu Haibo 刘海波
 Kong Deqiao 孔德俏
 Ma Wen 马雯
 Mu Wei 穆微
 Wang Lanyi 王蓝一
 Wei Dan 魏丹
 Xu Conglin 徐丛林
 Xu Peng 徐鹏
 Zhang Jianhua 张建华
 Zhang Shuai 张帅

Awards 
In January 2013, China Weather TV was assessed as "2012 China Media Academy Award · Annual Media Organization" and won an award named "The most valuable TV media for public welfare spreading".

In September 2014, China Weather TV 's programs 人与气候, 地球全角度 and 谈风说水 won awards named "The most promising program" and "The most influential media program". China Weather TV also won an award named "The top 10 social life channel award in China".

In March 2016, China Weather TV's programs 深海危机 and 国家气象播报——聚焦高温下儿童被锁车内事件 won "Kelei Cup" award. 深海危机 won the first award and 国家气象播报——聚焦高温下儿童被锁车内事件 won the third award.

References

External links 
China Weather TV's Official Sina Weibo

China Weather Web

China Meteorological Administration
Television channels and stations established in 2006
Pay television